In Euclidean geometry with triangle , the nine-point hyperbola is an instance of the nine-point conic described by American mathematician Maxime Bôcher in 1892. The celebrated nine-point circle is a separate instance of Bôcher's conic:
Given a triangle  and a point  in its plane, a conic can be drawn through the following nine points:
 the midpoints of the lines joining  to the vertices, and
 the points where these last named lines cut the sides of the triangle.

Allen

An approach to the nine-point hyperbola using the analytic geometry of split-complex numbers was devised by E. F. Allen in 1941.

It is used as the circumconic of triangle  Let  Then the nine-point conic is

Allen's description of the nine-point hyperbola followed a development of the nine-point circle that Frank Morley and his son published in 1933. They requisitioned the unit circle in the complex plane as the circumcircle of the given triangle.

In 1953 Allen extended his study to a nine-point conic of a triangle inscribed in any central conic.

Yaglom
For Yaglom, a hyperbola is a Minkowskian circle as in the Minkowski plane. Yaglom's description of this geometry is found in the "Conclusion" chapter of a book that initially addresses Galilean geometry. He considers a triangle inscribed in a "circumcircle" which is in fact a hyperbola. In the Minkowski plane the nine-point hyperbola is also described as a circle:
It is natural to refer to S as the six- (nine-) point circle of the (Minkowskian) triangle ; if  has an incircle , then the six- (nine-) point circle  of  touches its incircle  (Fig.173).

Others
In 2005 J. A. Scott used the unit hyperbola as the circumconic of triangle ABC and found conditions for it to include six triangle centers: the centroid X(2), the orthocenter X(4), the Fermat points X(13) and X(14), and the Napoleon points X(17) and X(18) as listed in the Encyclopedia of Triangle Centers. Scott’s hyperbola is a Kiepert hyperbola of the triangle.

Christopher Bath describes a nine-point rectangular hyperbola passing through these centers: incenter X(1), the three excenters, the centroid X(2), the de Longchamps point X(20), and the three points obtained by extending the triangle medians to twice their cevian length.

References

 Maxime Bôcher (1892) Nine-point Conic, Annals of Mathematics, link from Jstor.
 Maud A. Minthorn (1912) The Nine Point Conic, Master's dissertation at University of California, Berkeley, link from HathiTrust. Maude Ellen Minthorn, born 1883, LeMars, Iowa, died 1966, St. Petersburg, Florida. Dau. of Pennington Minthorn, 1856-1939, (brother of Hulda Minthorn Hoover, mother of Pres. Herbert Hoover) and Anna Mary Heald, 1887-1940, (sister of Franklin Herman Heald, founder of Lake Elsinore, California (WRH) Maud Minthorn also taught at Fresno, Cal, High School 1935-1940 
 Bjørn Felsager (2004) Minkowski geometry, Part 1, Minkowski geometry, Part 2 ICME-10 Copenhagen.

Curves defined for a triangle